Dr. TJ Owens Gilroy Early College Academy (known as GECA) is a prestigious early college high school located in unincorporated Santa Clara County, California, near Gilroy, at the southern edge of Silicon Valley, in the San Francisco Bay Area. A California Distinguished School, GECA regularly ranks among the top high schools in California and consistently ranks within the top 1% of the best high schools in the United States.

Founded by the Bill & Melinda Gates Foundation, GECA operates as an early college school, requiring its students to receive their college preparatory education through a mixture of honors high school classes, Advanced Placement (AP), and college classes, offered through partnership with Gavilan College, allowing most GECA students to graduate high school with an associate's degree.

GECA students have regularly been selected as National Merit Scholars and U.S. Presidential Scholars.

History
GECA was founded through a grant from the Bill & Melinda Gates Foundation and is now solely funded by the California Department of Education.

Dr. T.J. Owens, GECA's namesake, was the former dean of students at Gavilan College and president of the Gilroy Unified School Board. A prominent member of the national organization 100 Black Men of America and civil rights activist, Dr. Owens was a key figure in GECA's inception, but died two years before the early college academy was established.

Academics
Approximately 90 percent of the class of 2011 graduated and entered a four-year university or continued their education at Gavilan with the intention to transfer to one.

The school's non-weighted average API from 2011 to 2013 is 929 schoolwide, 900 for socioeconomically disadvantaged students, and 869 for English learners. Statewide, students of all groups average 790, socioeconomically disadvantaged students 742, and English learners 717.

GECA is one of ten schools participating in A Study of American Public High Schools with Academically-Competitive Admissions sponsored by Stanford University's Hoover Institution and the Thomas B. Fordham Institute.

Rankings
GECA is regularly ranked as one of the best high schools in California and the United States as a whole. GECA is the best performing of the 28 early college high schools in California.

The school was ranked 10th best in California and 54th best in the United States on the 2015 U.S. News & World Report rankings.

GECA was ranked 23rd best high school in California, and above 99% of 20,500 public high schools across the entire United States, placing 172 out of 20,500.

GECA is one of 40 Beat the Odds Schools in a study conducted by WestEd, which identified 40 schools that consistently and significantly outperforming schools with similar demographics on the California Standards Tests and the California Academic High School Exit Exam.

Awards
GECA was awarded the classification of California Distinguished School in 2013, which was renewed in 2019.

GECA was awarded the California Gold Ribbon in 2015.

Demographics
2013–2014 
 236 students: 114 Male (48.3%), 122 Female (51.7%)

Student life

Student Leadership

The GECA Associated Student Body (ASB) organizes events to foster school spirit and assists students in setting up clubs. Tribunal is the judicial branch of student government and addresses honor code violations such as bullying, cheating, and other behavioral issues.

Clubs

Student clubs include the gay-straight alliance, FLC club (currently suspended), film club, CSF (California Scholarship Federation), Yearbook, Outreach club, Red Cross club, Ignite (religion club), Operation Smile, Athletics Club, and Robotics Club. At the beginning of first semester, students can start a club if they meet certain requirements.

References

External links
Dr. TJ Owens Gilroy Early College Academy website
Gilroy Unified School District website

Early College High Schools
Charter high schools in California
High schools in Santa Clara County, California
Gilroy, California
Educational institutions in the United States with year of establishment missing
2007 establishments in California